Dale Kent Frizzell (February 11, 1929 – October 26, 2016) was an American attorney and politician from the state of Kansas. He served as a state senator in the Kansas State Senate from 1965 to 1967, and as Attorney General of Kansas from 1969 to 1971.

Education
He was an alumnus of the Friends University, and Washburn University Law School.

Career
Frizzell also served as United States Under Secretary of the Interior from 1975 to 1977, and as Assistant Attorney General for the Environment and Natural Resources from 1972 to 1973. He died on October 26, 2016.

References

1929 births
2016 deaths
People from Wichita, Kansas
Friends University alumni
Washburn University alumni
Republican Party Kansas state senators
Kansas Attorneys General
Kansas lawyers
United States Assistant Attorneys General for the Environment and Natural Resources Division
United States Department of the Interior officials
University of Tulsa College of Law faculty
20th-century American lawyers